Eliomar is a Portuguese language male given name, which is a variant of the Italian name Elio, meaning "sun" from the Greek name Helios. Related names include Elio, Eliodoro, and Elion. The name Eliomar may refer to:

Eliomar Correia Silva (born 1988), Brazilian footballer
Eliomar dos Santos Silva (born 1987), Brazilian footballer
Eliomar Marcón (born 1975), Brazilian footballer

References

Portuguese masculine given names
Brazilian given names